In the City is the second studio album by American musician Kevin Rudolf. It was released nationwide, physically and digitally, on November 24, 2008, via Cash Money Records and Universal Republic. Every song on the album was produced and written by Rudolf. "She Can Get It" was a production collaboration between Rudolf and Chad Hugo of The Neptunes.  "Let It Rock" was the first single released from the album. The song "NYC" was featured on an episode of CSI: NY and "Let It Rock" was featured on the Melrose Place pilot and The Hills as well as being featured as the theme song for the 2009 WWE Royal Rumble. The album has sold 102,000 copies in the US.

The album's first single, "Let It Rock" reached number 2 on the Canadian Hot 100, number 5 on the U.S. Billboard Hot 100, number 3 on the Australian ARIA charts and number 4 on the Irish Singles Chart.

"Welcome to the World", the version featuring Kid Cudi, is the second single released in February 2009, and reached number 58 on the US Hot 100 and peaked at number 42 on Australia's Aria Singles Chart.

Promotion
On February 25, 2009, Kevin Rudolf announced a 22-city U.S. tour with Hyper Crush, Cash Cash, The Audition and Go Crash Audio as supporting acts, beginning in Nashville's Rocketown venue and finishing at Baltimore's Sonar Nightclub.

Critical reception

In the City was met with "mixed or average" reviews from critics. At Metacritic, which assigns a weighted average rating out of 100 to reviews from mainstream publications, the album received an average score of 53 based on 9 reviews. 

Mikael Wood from Entertainment Weekly said that Rudolf "steps out with a weirdly infectious debut that mixes his rap-track know-how with his love of guitar-god theatrics. (Think "Beat It," not Limp Bizkit.)" Billboard writer Gary Graff noted how the record consisted of songs ranging from the "thumping, synthesizer-heavy club anthems" found in the featured rap collaborations to the more "mellower moments ("I Song", "Scarred")". He concluded that the closing track "Great Escape" "displays some of the chops that could ultimately separate him from the pack." AllMusic's David Jeffries highlighted the Lil Wayne and Rick Ross-featured tracks but felt the album overall was filled with "cringe-worthy" lyrics and "so-so filler", concluding that: "In the City gets by on hooks and hugeness, like an irony-free Andrew W.K., Timbaland working with Aerosmith, or a jaded version of the Jonas Brothers now willing to drop the F-bomb." Alex Sheremet of RapReviews wrote that: "In the City offers good production, excellent melodies, and – of course – the same song, idea(s), and kinds of guest appearances many times over. Still, I'd recommend it as a blueprint for potential. It's also good to enjoy on a visceral level, if you're interested in that sort of thing."

Rolling Stones Christian Hoard said that despite the Lil Wayne-assisted single, he found the rest of Rudolf's debut to be "a middling rock record dressed up in sleek digital clothes." Evan Sawdey from PopMatters was critical of Rudolf's clumsy lyrical output on being above the dark side of achieving fame and celebrity culture, showing "very little musical variation" beyond the "Let It Rock" formula and felt the "token acoustic tracks ("I Song" and "Scarred")" were interchangeable from each other, concluding that: "If anything, Rudolf does show promise beyond that of just a simple studio session man. He has some solid ideas and keen sense of production; the problem is that his solo songs, by and large, suffer from a frightening lack of creativity and a remarkably shallow lyrical outlook." Pitchfork contributor Ian Cohen panned In the City for taking the dumb parts of "80s corporate rock" without any sense of fun and having "little indication it was constructed by real people in real time." He concluded by sarcastically writing: "But just in case you're taking a half-full approach to Rebirth, you might want to hear this first."

Track listing
All tracks produced by Kevin Rudolf; track 10 co-produced by The Neptunes

Chart performance

References

2008 debut albums
Kevin Rudolf albums
Cash Money Records albums
Universal Records albums
Albums produced by the Neptunes
Electronic rock albums by American artists